Muscowpetung 80 is an Indian reserve of the Muscowpetung First Nation in Saskatchewan. It is 31 kilometres west of Fort Qu'Appelle along the south-west shore of Pasqua Lake, which is one of four Fishing Lakes. In the 2016 Canadian Census, it recorded a population of 275 living in 87 of its 112 total private dwellings. In the same year, its Community Well-Being index was calculated at 54 of 100, compared to 58.4 for the average First Nations community and 77.5 for the average non-Indigenous community.

Lake Muscowpetung, which is a small lake on the Muscowpetung Indian Reserve along the Qu'Appelle River, is sometimes referred to as one of the Fishing Lakes. It is located just west of Pasqua Lake.

See also
List of Indian reserves in Saskatchewan

References

Indian reserves in Saskatchewan
Division No. 6, Saskatchewan
Muscowpetung Saulteaux Nation